Government College of Applied Human Science is a government college formerly known as the College of Home Economics.

History
American Ford Foundation & Oklahoma State University, USA and the government of East Pakistan started the college in the year 1961 with just twenty-five students. This is the first college of Bangladesh for studying home economics. Mrs Hamida Khanam was the founder principal of this college.

Campus
The college campuses are located at Azimpur, Lalmatia, Green Road of Dhaka and Mymensingh. The Azimpur campus having Total campus 10.3 acres of land. there are 21 classrooms, 5 seminar room, 8 laboratory, 1 Library in Azimpur campus etc in Azimpur campus.

Courses
Level of education is HSC, B.Sc (Hons.) & M.S. there are 5 Honours Department. This courses are conducted under Biology Faculty of the University of Dhaka.

Departments
There are five departments in five major area of home economics:-

 Food and Nutrition
 Resource Management and      Entrepreneurship 
 Child Development and Social Relationship
 Art and Creative Studies
 Clothing and Textile

Admission

B.Sc. 
Admission test is conducted by Faculty of Biological Science of the University of Dhaka. A thousand of students can get admitted each year for B.Sc Course in this college.

HSC 
There is no separate admission test for HSC admission.

Notable alumni
 Bibi Russell
 Nasim Ferdous, Ambassador to Indonesia (2002–2006), earned her master's degree in 1975.
 Siddika Kabir

Notable faculty
 Husna Banu Khanam

References

University of Dhaka
Vocational education in Bangladesh
Home economics education
Educational institutions established in 1961
1961 establishments in East Pakistan